The Jack Russell Terrier is a small terrier that has its origins in fox hunting in England. It is principally white-bodied and smooth, rough or broken-coated and can be any colour.

Small tan and white terriers that technically belong to other breeds are sometimes known erroneously as "Jack Russells". Each breed has different physical characteristics according to the standards of their national breed clubs; size and proportions are often used to tell them apart. However, the Fédération Cynologique Internationale (FCI) regards the Russell terrier as a sub-type of Jack Russell terrier. Jack Russells are also frequently confused with the Parson Russell Terrier.

Jack Russells are an energetic breed that rely on a high level of exercise and stimulation. They are relatively free from any serious health complaints. Originating from dogs bred and used by the Rev. John Russell in the early 19th century, from whom the breed takes its name, the Jack Russell has similar origins to the modern Fox Terrier. It has gone through several changes over the years, corresponding to different use and breed standards set by kennel clubs. Recognition by kennel clubs for the Jack Russell breed has been opposed by the breed's parent societies – which resulted in the breeding and recognition of the Parson Russell terrier. Jack Russells have appeared many times in film, television, and print – with several historical dogs of note.

History

Sporting parson 

The small white fox-working terriers we know today were first bred by the Reverend John Russell, a parson and hunting enthusiast born in 1795, and they can trace their origin to the now extinct English white terrier. Difficulty in differentiating the dog from the creature it was pursuing brought about the need for a mostly white dog, and so in 1819 during his last year of university at Exeter College, Oxford, he purchased a small white and tan terrier female named Trump from a local milkman in the nearby small hamlet of Elsfield or Marston. Trump epitomised his ideal Fox Terrier, which, at the time, was a term used for any terrier which was used to bolt foxes out of their burrows. Her colouring was described as "...white, with just a patch of dark tan over each eye and ear; whilst a similar dot, not larger than a penny piece, marks the root of the tail." Davies, a friend of Russell's, wrote: "Trump was such an animal as Russell had only seen in his dreams". She was the basis for a breeding program to develop a terrier with high stamina for the hunt as well as the courage and formation to chase out foxes that had gone to ground. By the 1850s, these dogs were recognised as a distinct breed.

An important attribute in this dog was a tempered aggressiveness that would provide the necessary drive to pursue and bolt the fox, without resulting in physical harm to the quarry and effectively ending the chase, which was considered unsporting. Russell was said to have prided himself that his terriers never tasted blood. This line of terriers developed by John Russell was well respected for those qualities, and his dogs were often taken on by hunt enthusiasts. It is unlikely, however, that any dogs alive today can be proved to be descendants from Trump, as Russell was forced to sell all his dogs on more than one occasion because of financial difficulty, and had only four aged (and non-breeding) terriers left when he died in 1883.

The Fox terrier and Jack Russell terrier type dogs of today are all descended from dogs of that period. However, documented pedigrees earlier than 1862 have not been found. Several records remain of documented breeding by John Russell between the 1860s and 1880s. The Fox Terrier Club was formed in 1875 with Russell as one of the founder members; its breed standard was aspiration, and not a description of how the breed appeared then. By the start of the 20th century, the Fox Terrier had altered more towards the modern breed, but in some parts of the country the old style of John Russell's terriers remained, and it is from those dogs that the modern Jack Russell type has descended.

Many breeds can claim heritage to the early Fox Terrier of this period, including the Brazilian Terrier, Japanese Terrier, Miniature Fox Terrier, Ratonero Bodeguero Andaluz, Rat Terrier, and Tenterfield Terrier.

After John Russell 

Following Russell's death, the only people who made serious efforts to continue those strains were two men, one in Chislehurst with the surname of East, and another in Cornwall named Archer. East, at one point, had several couples, all of which were descended from one of Russell's dogs.

Arthur Blake Heinemann created the first breed standard and, in 1894, he founded the Devon and Somerset Badger Club, the aims of which were to promote badger digging rather than fox hunting, and the breeding of terriers suitable for this purpose. Terriers were acquired from Nicholas Snow of Oare, and they were likely descended from Russell's original dogs, as Russell would probably have hunted at some point with Snow's hunting club and is likely to have provided at least some of their original terriers. By the turn of the 20th century, Russell's name had become associated with this breed of dog.

The club was later renamed the Parson Jack Russell Terrier Club. Badger digging required a different type of dog than fox hunting, and it is likely that Bull Terrier stock was introduced to strengthen the breed, which may have caused the creation of a shorter legged variety of Jack Russell terrier that started to appear around this period. At the same time that a split was appearing between show and working Fox terriers, a further split was occurring between two different types of white terrier, both carrying Jack Russell's name. Heinemann was invited to judge classes for working terriers at Crufts with an aim to bring working terriers back into the show ring and influence those that disregard working qualities in dogs. These classes were continued for several years by various judges, but Charles Cruft dropped the attempt as the classes were never heavily competed. Following Heinemann's death in 1930, the kennel and leadership of the club passed to Annie Harris, but the club itself folded shortly before World War II.

Post-World War II 
Following World War II, the requirement for hunting dogs drastically declined, and with it the numbers of Jack Russell terriers. The dogs were increasingly used as family and companion dogs. Further crossbreeding occurred, with Welsh Corgis, Chihuahuas, and other smaller breeds of terrier. The offspring of these crosses became known as "Puddin' Dogs", "Shortie Jacks", or "Russell Terriers".

The Jack Russell Terrier Club of America (JRTCA) was formed in 1976 by Ailsa Crawford, one of the first Jack Russell terrier breeders in the United States. Size ranges for dogs were kept broad, with the ability of working dogs awarded higher than those in conformation shows. An open registry was maintained, with restricted line breeding. Registration for the club is made at adulthood for Jack Russells, rather than at birth, to ensure the breed's qualities remain, given the open registry.

Several breed clubs appeared in the United Kingdom during the 1970s to promote the breed, including the Jack Russell Club of Great Britain (JRTCGB) and the South East Jack Russell Terrier Club (SEJRTC). While the JRTCGB sought to ensure that the breed's working ability remained through non-recognition with other breed registries, the SEJRTC activity sought recognition with the UK Kennel club. In 1983, the Parson Jack Russell Club of Great Britain (PJRTCGB) was resurrected to seek Kennel Club recognition for the breed. Although the application was initially rejected, a new standard was created for the PJRTCGB based on the standard of the SEJRTC, and under that standard the breed was recognised by the Kennel Club in 1990 as the Parson Jack Russell terrier. Jack was dropped from the official name in 1999, and the recognised name of the breed became the Parson Russell Terrier.

In the late 1990s, the American Kennel Club explored the possibility of recognising the Jack Russell Terrier. This move was opposed by the Jack Russell Terrier Club of America as they did not want the breed to lose its essential working characteristics. The Jack Russell Terrier Breeders Association formed and petitioned the AKC; the breed's admission was granted in 2001. Under the AKC-recognised standard, the size of the breed was narrowed from the previous club's standard, and the name of the AKC-recognised Jack Russell Terrier was changed to Parson Russell Terrier, with the Jack Russell Terrier Breeders Association renamed to the Parson Russell Terrier Association of America.

The Australian National Kennel Council (ANKC) and the New Zealand Kennel Club (NZCK) are some of national kennel associations that register both the Jack Russell terrier and the Parson Russell terrier; however, the size requirements for the Jack Russell terrier under both those standards would classify a dog as a Russell terrier in the United States. In 2009, there were 1073 Jack Russells registered with the ANKC, compared to 18 for the Parson Russell terrier. Other modern breeds are often mistaken for modern Jack Russell terriers, including their cousin the Parson Russell terrier, the Tenterfield terrier, and the Rat Terrier. Several other modern breeds exist that descended from the early Fox Terrier breed, including the Brazilian Terrier, Japanese Terrier, Miniature Fox Terrier, Ratonero Bodeguero Andaluz, Rat Terrier, and Tenterfield Terrier.

Description 

Due to their working nature, Jack Russell terriers remain much as they were some 200 years ago. The body length must be in proportion to the height, and the dog should present a compact, balanced image. Predominantly white in coloration (more than 51%) with black and/or brown and/or tan markings, they exhibit either a smooth, rough or a combination of both which is known as a broken coat. A broken-coated dog may have longer hair on the tail or face than that which is seen on a smooth-coated dog. The skin can sometimes show a pattern of small black or brown spots, referred to as "ticking" that do not carry through to the outer coat. All coat types should be dense double coats that are neither silky (in the case of smooth coats) nor woolly (in the case of rough coats).

The head should be of moderate width at the ears, narrowing to the eyes, and slightly flat between the ears. There should be a defined but not overpronounced stop at the end of the muzzle where it meets the head, and a black nose. The jaw should be powerful and well boned with a scissor bite and straight teeth. The eyes are almond shaped and dark coloured and should be full of life and intelligence. Small V-shaped ears of moderate thickness are carried forward on the head. When the dog is alert, the tip of the V should not extend past the outer corner of the eyes.

The Jack Russell should always appear balanced and alert. As it is primarily a working terrier, its most important physical characteristic is its chest size, which must not be so large that it prevents the dog from entering and working in burrows. The red fox is the traditional quarry of the Jack Russell terrier, so the working Jack Russell must be small enough to pursue it.

Differences from related breeds 

The Jack Russell terrier and Parson Russell Terrier breeds are similar, sharing a common origin, but have several marked differences – the most notable being the range of acceptable heights. Other differences in the Parson Russell can include a longer head and larger chest as well as overall a larger body size. However, the Parson Russell is a conformation show standard whereas the Jack Russell standard is a more general working standard.

The Russell Terrier, which is also sometimes called the English Jack Russell terrier or the Short Jack Russell terrier is a generally smaller related breed. Although sometimes called the English or Irish Jack Russell terrier, this is not the recognised height of Jack Russells in the United Kingdom. According to the Jack Russell Club of Great Britain's breed standard, it is the same size as the standard for Jack Russells in the United States, . Compared to the Parson Russell Terrier, the Russell Terrier should always be longer than tall at the withers, whereas the Parson Russell's points should be of equal distance. The Fédération Cynologique Internationale standard for the Jack Russell terrier has this smaller size listed as a requirement. Terrierman Eddie Chapman, who has hunted in Devon for more than 30 years, the same area that John Russell himself hunted, notes that, "I can state categorically that if given the choice, ninety-nine percent of hunt terrier men would buy an under  worker, if it was available, over a  one."

Temperament 

Jack Russells are first and foremost a working terrier. Originally bred to bolt foxes from their dens during hunts, they are used on numerous ground-dwelling quarry such as groundhog, badger, otter, and red and grey fox. The working JRT is required to locate quarry in the earth, and then either bolt it or hold it in place until they are dug to. To accomplish this, the dog will not bark but will expect attention to the quarry continuously. Because the preservation of this working ability is of highest importance to most registered JRTCA/JRTCGB breeders, Jack Russells tend to be extremely intelligent, athletic, fearless, and vocal dogs. It is not uncommon for these dogs to become moody or destructive if not properly stimulated and exercised, as they have a tendency to bore easily and will often create their own fun when left alone to entertain themselves, leading to the semi-affectionate nickname among suburban pet dogs of "Jack Russell Terrorist".

Their high energy and drive make these dogs ideally suited to a number of different dog sports such as flyball or agility. Obedience classes are also recommended to potential owners, as Jack Russells can be stubborn at times and aggressive towards other animals and humans if not properly socialized. Despite their small size, these dogs are not recommended for the condominium or apartment dweller unless the owner is ready to take on the daunting task of providing the dog with the necessary amount of exercise and stimulation. They have a tremendous amount of energy for their size, a fact which can sometimes lead to trouble involving larger animals. They may seem never to tire and will still be energetic after their owner has called it a day. While socialised members of the breed are friendly towards children, they will not tolerate abuse even if it is unintentional.

Health 

The breed has a reputation for being healthy with a long lifespan. Breeders have protected the gene pool, and direct in-line breeding has been prevented. Jack Russells can live from 13 to 16 years given proper care. However, certain lines have been noted for having specific health concerns and, therefore, could occur in any line or generation because of recessive genes. These issues can include hereditary cataracts, ectopia lentis, congenital deafness, patellar luxation, ataxia, myasthenia gravis, Legg–Calvé–Perthes syndrome, and von Willebrand disease.

Being a hunt-driven dog, the Jack Russell will usually pursue most creatures that it encounters. This includes the skunk, and the breed is prone to skunk toxic shock syndrome. The chemical in the skunk spray is absorbed by the dog and causes the red blood cells to undergo haemolysis, which can occasionally lead to fatal anaemia and kidney failure. If sprayed underground, it can also cause chemical burning of the cornea. Treatments are available to flush the toxin out of the dog's system.

Eye disorders 
Lens luxation, also known as ectopia lentis is the most common hereditary disorder in Jack Russell terriers. Even so, this condition is not a common occurrence in the breed. Most frequently appearing in dogs between the ages of 3 and 8 years old, it is where the lens in one or both eyes becomes displaced. There are two types, posterior luxation (where the lens slips to the back of the eye) and anterior luxation (where the lens slips forward). Posterior luxation is the less severe of the two types, as the eye can appear normal although the dog's eyesight will be affected. In anterior luxation, the lens can slip forward and rub against the cornea, damaging it. Anterior luxation also has a high probability of causing glaucoma which can lead to partial or complete blindness. Treatment is available and may include both medical and surgical options. Secondary lens luxation is caused by trauma to the eye and is not hereditary. The condition appears in a number of terrier breeds as well as the Border collie, Brittany and Cardigan Welsh corgi.

Cataracts can affect any breed of dog and is the same condition as seen in humans. Here the lens of the eye hardens and is characterised by cloudiness in the eye. Cataracts will blur the dog's vision and can lead to permanent blindness if left untreated. While considered mainly a hereditary disease, it can also be caused by diabetes, old age, radiation, eye injury or exposure to high temperatures.

Musculoskeletal conditions 
Patellar luxation, also known as luxating patella, is a hereditary disorder affecting the knees. It is where the kneecap slips off the groove on which it normally sits. The effects can be temporary with the dog running while holding its hind leg in the air before running on it again once the kneecap slipped back into place as if nothing has happened. Dogs can have a problem with both rear knees, and complications can include arthritis or torn knee ligaments. Severe cases can require surgery. Some are prone to dislocation of the kneecaps, inherited eye diseases, deafness and Legg Perthes—a disease of the hip joints of small dog breeds. Prone to mast cell tumors. Legg–Calvé–Perthes syndrome, also called Avascular Necrosis of the Femoral Head, is where the ball section of the femur in the hip joint deteriorates following interruption of the blood flow and is the same condition as in humans. In dogs, this causes lameness of the hind-legs, the thigh muscles to atrophy and pain in the joint. It usually occurs between 6–12 months of age and has been documented in a variety of other terrier breeds including the Border terrier, Lakeland terrier, and Wheaten terrier.

Well-known Jack Russell terriers 

Nipper was a dog born in 1884 who was thought to be a dog of the Jack Russell terrier type. He was the inspiration for the painting Dog looking at and listening to a Phonograph, later renamed His Master's Voice. The painting was used by a variety of music related companies including The Gramophone Company, EMI, the Victor Talking Machine Company, and RCA. Today it remains in use incorporated into the logo for HMV in the UK and Europe.

A Jack Russell named Bothie made history in 1982 as part of the Transglobe Expedition. Owned by explorers Ranulph and Ginny Fiennes, he became the first dog to travel to both the North and South Poles. This feat is unlikely to be repeated, as all dogs have been banned from Antarctica by the Antarctic Treaty nations since 1994, due to fears that they could transmit diseases to the native seal population. Ranulph Fiennes and Charles Burton actually made the trip to the north pole by powered sledges before signalling to the base camp that they had arrived. To celebrate their achievement, a plane was sent out to take the two men champagne, along with Bothie.

On 29 April 2007, a Jack Russell named George saved five children at a carnival in New Zealand from an attack by two pit bulls. He was reported to have charged at them and held them at bay long enough for the children to get away. Killed by the pit bulls, he was posthumously awarded the PDSA Gold Medal in 2009, the animal equivalent of the George Cross. A statue has been erected in Manaia, New Zealand, in his memory. A former US Marine also donated to George's owner a Purple Heart award he had received for service in Vietnam.

In 2019, Boris Johnson and his partner Carrie Symonds took a Jack Russell cross from an animal rescue charity in Wales. The dog's name is Dilyn and he became a famous dog at a polling station in the general election.

During the ongoing 2022 Russian invasion of Ukraine, a 2-year old Jack Russell named Patron has been working with the State Emergency Service of Ukraine to sniff out Russian explosives. As of April 20, 2022, the Ukrainian Government announced that he had located nearly 90 explosives.

On screen and in literature 

In the UK, one of the more recognisable canine stars was restaurateur and chef Rick Stein's irrepressible terrier Chalky, who frequently upstaged his owner on his various cookery series. He had his own line of merchandise, including plushes, tea towels, art prints, art paw prints and two real ales – Chalky's Bite and Chalky's Bark, which won gold in the Quality Drink Awards 2009. Chalky was given a BBC obituary when he died in 2007.

Moose and his son Enzo played the role of Eddie on the long-running American TV sitcom Frasier. Eddie belonged to lead character Frasier's father Martin Crane, and constantly "stole the show" with his deadpan antics, receiving more fan mail than any other Frasier character. Moose and Enzo also starred as Skip in the 2000 film My Dog Skip.

Soccer was a Jack Russell who became the star of the American TV series Wishbone, which aired from 1995 to 2001. In the 2009 movie Hotel for Dogs, Friday, one of the main characters is a Jack Russell, played by the dog actor Cosmo. Cosmo went on to appear in the films Paul Blart: Mall Cop and Beginners.

Uggie (2002–2015) was an animal actor, appearing in commercials starting in 2005 and in the films Water for Elephants and The Artist, both in 2011. In the same year, based on interest following The Artist, the "Consider Uggie" campaign was launched, which attempted to gain the dog a nomination for an Academy Award. In 2012, Uggie was named Nintendo's first-ever spokesdog.

Sykes (est. 2001 - 2019) was a dog actor from Clifton, Oxfordshire, England.  He was best known in the UK for his appearance as "Harvey" in Thinkbox's three television commercials, and, under his real name in five seasons of Midsomer Murders.  He also appeared in several Hollywood blockbusters, as well as in a UK TV movie, several series and miniseries.   He retired in 2016 after a long career on the big and small screen.  Sykes was also a champion agility competitor.

A clever, almost human like Jack Russel Terrier, named Jack, played a central role in the 1980s TV adventure series Tales of the Gold Monkey.

K.K. Slider is a Jack Russell who is a main character in the Animal Crossing series developed by Nintendo. K.K. is a musician who performs to the townsfolk. He has appeared in every Animal Crossing game to date since the original Animal Crossing game in 2001 to Animal Crossing: New Horizons in 2020.

Crossbreeds 

The planned-mating crossbreed of a Jack Russell terrier and a Beagle is called a Jackabee. Jackabees are believed to have first been bred in the United States. They typically have a muscular body with patches and a long tail. The breed brings together the hunting terrier with the scenthound.

See also 
 Fox hunting
 Working terriers

Footnotes

References

External links 

 

Dog breeds originating in England
FCI breeds
Terriers